Kunlon is a small town in Taunggyi Township, Taunggyi District, Shan State, eastern Burma. It contains a lake and Kunlon Dam. It lies along National Road 43, north of Taunggyi and south of Yedwingyi.

References

External links
Maplandia World Gazetteer

Populated places in Taunggyi District
Taunggyi Township